Sherbro International Airport  was an   international airport located outside the town of Bonthe on Sherbro Island, Sierra Leone.

The airport is reported closed since around 2002, possibly in connection with the Sierra Leone Civil War.

There are plans to construct a new airport runway
 on Sherbro Island. The runway will be part of a new development program for the island.

References

External links

Airports in Sierra Leone